The 20th Golden Globe Awards, honoring the best in film and television for 1962, were held on March 5, 1963.

Winners

Film

Best Film - Drama
 Lawrence of Arabia
The Chapman Report
Days of Wine and Roses
Freud: The Secret Passion
Hemingway's Adventures of a Young Man
The Inspector
The Longest Day
The Miracle Worker
Mutiny on the Bounty
To Kill a Mockingbird

Best Film - Comedy
 That Touch of Mink
The Best of Enemies
Boys' Night Out
If a Man Answers
Period of Adjustment

Best Film - Musical
 The Music Man
Billy Rose's Jumbo
Girls! Girls! Girls!
Gypsy
The Wonderful World of the Brothers Grimm

Best Actor - Drama
 Gregory Peck - To Kill a Mockingbird
Bobby Darin - Pressure Point
Laurence Harvey - The Wonderful World of the Brothers Grimm
Jackie Gleason - Gigot
Burt Lancaster - Birdman of Alcatraz
Jack Lemmon - Days of Wine and Roses
James Mason - Lolita
Paul Newman - Sweet Bird of Youth
Peter O'Toole - Lawrence of Arabia
Anthony Quinn - Lawrence of Arabia

Best Actress - Drama
 Geraldine Page - Sweet Bird of Youth
Anne Bancroft - The Miracle Worker
Bette Davis - What Ever Happened to Baby Jane?
Katharine Hepburn - Long Day's Journey into Night
Glynis Johns - The Chapman Report
Melina Mercouri - Phaedra
Lee Remick - Days of Wine and Roses
Susan Strasberg - Hemingway's Adventures of a Young Man
Shelley Winters - Lolita
Susannah York - Freud: The Secret Passion

Best Actor - Comedy or Musical
 Marcello Mastroianni - Divorce, Italian Style (Divorzio all'italiana)
Stephen Boyd - Billy Rose's Jumbo
Jimmy Durante - Billy Rose's Jumbo
Cary Grant - That Touch of Mink
Charlton Heston - The Pigeon That Took Rome
Karl Malden - Gypsy
Robert Preston - The Music Man
Alberto Sordi - The Best of Enemies
James Stewart - Mr. Hobbs Takes a Vacation

Best Actress - Comedy or Musical
 Rosalind Russell - Gypsy
Doris Day - Billy Rose's Jumbo
Jane Fonda - Period of Adjustment
Shirley Jones - The Music Man
Natalie Wood - Gypsy

Best Supporting Actor
 Omar Sharif - Lawrence of Arabia
Ed Begley - Sweet Bird of Youth
Victor Buono - What Ever Happened to Baby Jane?
Harry Guardino - The Pigeon That Took Rome
Ross Martin - Experiment in Terror
Paul Newman - Hemingway's Adventures of a Young Man
Cesar Romero - If a Man Answers
Telly Savalas - Birdman of Alcatraz
Peter Sellers - Lolita
Harold J. Stone - The Chapman Report

Best Supporting Actress
 Angela Lansbury - The Manchurian Candidate
Patty Duke - The Miracle Worker
Hermione Gingold - The Music Man
Shirley Knight - Sweet Bird of Youth
Susan Kohner - Freud: The Secret Passion
Gabriella Pallotta - The Pigeon That Took Rome
Martha Raye - Billy Rose's Jumbo
Kaye Stevens - The Interns
Jessica Tandy - Hemingway's Adventures of a Young Man
Tarita Teriipaia - Mutiny on the Bounty

Best Director
 David Lean - Lawrence of Arabia
George Cukor - The Chapman Report
Morton DaCosta - The Music Man
Blake Edwards - Days of Wine and Roses
John Frankenheimer - The Manchurian Candidate
John Huston - Freud: The Secret Passion
Stanley Kubrick - Lolita
Mervyn LeRoy - Gypsy
Robert Mulligan - To Kill a Mockingbird
Martin Ritt - Hemingway's Adventures of a Young Man
Ismael Rodríguez - My Son, the Hero (Los hermanos del hierro)

Best Film Promoting International Understanding
 To Kill a Mockingbird
 The Best of Enemies
 The Interns

Best Music, Original Score
To Kill a Mockingbird - Elmer Bernstein
Lawrence of Arabia - Maurice Jarre
Mutiny on the Bounty - Bronislau Kaper
Taras Bulba - Franz Waxman
The Music Man - Meredith Willson

Best Cinematography (Black & White)
The Longest Day - Henri Persin, Walter Wottitz, Jean Bourgoin

Best Cinematography (Colour)
Lawrence of Arabia - Freddie Young

Television
Only winners announced

Best TV Program
 The Dick Powell Show

Best TV Show - Comedy
 Mister Ed

Best TV Star - Male
 Richard Chamberlain - Dr. Kildare

Best TV Star - Female
 Donna Reed - The Donna Reed Show

Best TV Producer/Director
 Rod Serling - The Twilight Zone

Other Awards

Best International News Coverage
Telstar

Most Promising Newcomer - Male
Keir Dullea
Peter O'Toole
Omar Sharif
Terence Stamp
 Paul Wallace

Most Promising Newcomer - Female
Patty Duke
Sue Lyon
Rita Tushingham
 Daliah Lavi
 Janet Margolin
 Suzanne Pleshette

Cecil B. DeMille Award
Bob Hope

References
IMdb 1963 Golden Globe Awards

020
1962 film awards
1962 television awards
1962 awards in the United States
March 1963 events in the United States